This is a list of English language small presses, small publishers, current or past, that have published (printed) works of fiction and nonfiction, poetry, short stories, essays, pamphlets, limited edition or collectible books and chapbooks, and other forms of literature. In addition to publishing few books per year, the print runs of their titles are often smaller than for books from larger publishers. This list does include periodic publishers of poetry, and literature journals and magazines, including alternative comic books. This list does not include exclusively online publishers, academic publishers (who often publish very limited print runs, but for a different market), or businesses operating solely as printers, such as print-on-demand companies or vanity presses.

A

 Advent Press
 Adventures Unlimited Press
 Ahadada Books
 AK Press
 Akashic Books
 Albion Village Press
 Alternative Comics
 Amra Press
 And/Or Press
 Arkham House
 Armida Publications
 Armitage House
 Ashendene Press
 ASIA Publishers (English/Korean bilingual works)
 Atlas Press
 Aunt Lute Books

B

 Backwaters Press
 Bellevue Literary Press
 BenBella Books
 Between the Lines Books
 Bitter Lemon Press
 Black Lawrence Press
 Black Sun Press
 Blue Moon Press
 Boydell & Brewer
 Burning Deck Press
 Burning Shore Press

C

 Café Royal Books
 Calamari Press
 Cheap Street Press
 Circlet Press
 City Lights Bookstore & Publishers
 Coach House Press
 Contact Editions
 Copper Canyon Press
 Cuala Press

D

 Dedalus Books
 DNA Publications
 Donald M. Grant, Publisher, Inc.
 Doves Press
 Dun Emer Press
 Dusie Press

E

 EDLIS Café Press
 Eidolon Publications
 Eland Books
 ENC Press
 Enslow Publishers, Inc.
 Etruscan Press
 Europa Press
 Exact Change

F

 FabJob Inc.
 Fanfrolico Press
 Fantasy Press
 Featherproof Books
 Fedogan and Bremer
 Fiction Collective Two
 Flying Fame Press
 Flying Fish Books
 Flying Fish Press
 Fortune Press
 Four Walls Eight Windows
 FPCI
 Fugue State Press
 Fulcrum Press

G

 Gnome Press
 Golden Cockerel Press
 Graywolf Press
 Grey Walls Press
 Griffith Review
 GUD Magazine

H

 Hangman Books
 Harbor Mountain Press
 Haymarket Books
 Headmistress Press
 Hogarth Press
 Hours Press

I

 Influx Press
 ISFiC Press
 Ishi Press

K

 Kelmscott Press
 Katydid Books
 Knockabout Comics
 Kore Press
 Korero Press

L

 Last Gasp (publisher)
 Legend Press

M

 Macleay Press
 Mandrake of Oxford
 Mandrake Press
 Marick Press
 Matrix Press
 Mayapple Press
 Megara Publishing
 Melville House Publishing
 Menard Press
 Mercury House
 Migrant Press
 Milkweed Editions
 Moschatel Press
 Mourne Press
 Mycroft & Moran

N

 Necronomicon Press
 NESFA Press
 New Rivers Press
 New Village Press
 New Writers Press
 Nonesuch Press

O

 Obsidian House Publishing
 OR Books
 Ovid Press

P

 Pagan Publishing
 Parallax Press
 Permeable Press
 Phantasia Press
 Pirate Press
 Poetry Bookshop
 Press Gang Publishers
 Purple House Press
 PS Publishing
 Pushcart Press
 Pushkin Press

R

 Richards Press
 Ronin Publishing

S

 St James Park Press

 St. Dominic's Press
 Salt Publishing
 Sceptre Press
 Scribe
 Seizin Press
 Self Publish, Be Happy
 Serif
 Seven Stories Press
 Shasta
 Slough Press
 Small Beer Press
 Soft Skull Press
 Sort of Books
 Spork Press
 Starblaze Graphics
 Steamshovel Press
 Stone Bridge Press
 Subterranean Press

T

 Tarpaulin Sky Press
 terra incognita arts organisation + publishers
 This Press
 Three Mountains Press
 Ticonderoga Publications
 Tiny Hardcore Press
 Tupelo Press
 Two Dollar Radio
 Twyn Barlwm Press

U

 Ugly Duckling Presse
 Urban Books

V

 Vale Press
 Vine Press

W

 Wakefield Press
 Washington Writers Publishing House
 Weekend Press

 Wrecking Ball Press

X

 Xavier House Publishing

See also 
 Association of Little Presses
 Private press
 Self-publishing
 Small Press Distribution, wholesale distributor of small press materials
 List of English-language book publishing companies
 List of English-language literary presses

References

English Language Small Presses